Suksun is an urban locality (a work settlement) and the administrative center of Suksunsky District of Perm Krai, Russia, located on the left bank of the Sylva River (a tributary of the Chusovaya River),  from the city of Perm. Population:

Etymology
The name is of Turkic origin and means cold water.

History
Suksun was first mentioned as a settlement in 1651. The town grew around the copper smelting and iron works plant built by Akinfiy Demidov in 1727–1729. Urban-type settlement status was granted to it on June 20, 1933.

In the mid 18th century, due to the presence of copper, the town became known for the production of copper utensils and Samovars. While copper is no longer mined in Suksun, Samovars are still being manufactured there.

References

External links

Urban-type settlements in Perm Krai
Krasnoufimsky Uyezd